Zephyr Headwear (also known as Z-Hats) is  an American-based company that designs an produces headwear, apparel and accessories for sports fans, athletes and the general public. It was founded in 1993 in San Diego, California and currently employs 45 people. Zephyr produces hats for 250-300 colleges, professional sports organizations including National Hockey League and National Basketball Association teams, as well as artistic and stylized hats. The company is headquartered in Loveland, Colorado.

History 
Zephyr was founded by David Gormley, a former retailer who owned four Pro Image sports apparel franchises in Southern California. Zephyr initially focused on producing collegiate headwear, rather than professional headwear. The company grew to become the largest college licensee in 2000, selling more product than Nike.

References

External links 
 Official site

Sportswear brands
Sporting goods manufacturers of the United States
Clothing companies of the United States
Clothing companies established in 1993
American companies established in 1993